The US Highways in Wisconsin comprise 14 current and three former United States Numbered Highways in Wisconsin.


Mainline highways

Special routes
Except were indicated, the following highways are or were locally maintained.

See also

References

External links
Wisconsin Highways

 
U.S. Highways